Maurice Roy Tadman (28 June 1921 – 26 November 1994) was an English footballer who played as a centre forward.

He began his career in non-league football with Bexleyheath & Welling before playing alongside his older brother George at Charlton Athletic. His progress was halted by the Second World War, but he returned to the club when hostilities had ceased. Despite being a prolific goalscorer for the club's reserve team, he was unable to force his way into the first team and was transferred to Plymouth Argyle for £4,000 in August 1947. He soon established himself as the club's first choice striker and finished as top goalscorer in five of his first seven seasons at Home Park. He left the club in 1955, having joined an elite group of players to have scored more than 100 goals, to finish his career in Northern Ireland as player-manager of Belfast Distillery.

Playing career
Tadman began his career with local team Bexleyheath & Welling, before joining his older brother, George, at Charlton Athletic. His progress there was halted due to the outbreak of the Second World War. He resumed his career after hostilities had ended, making three appearances for Charlton before joining Plymouth Argyle in the summer of 1947. He would spend the next eight years with the club, playing alongside other Argyle greats like Jack Chisholm, George Dews, Neil Dougall, Alex Govan, and Bill Shortt. His one major honour with the club came in 1952 when the Pilgrims won the Third Division South title and promotion back to the Second Division. He made 253 appearances in all competitions for the club, scoring 112 goals, before moving to Northern Ireland in July 1955.

Managerial career
Tadman joined Belfast Distillery as player-manager in July 1955. He would continue playing for another two years before retiring in order to concentrate on management. He won the Ulster Cup with the club in 1958 before leaving later that year in December.

Honours
Football League Third Division South
 Winner (1): 1951–52

Ulster Cup
 Winner (1): 1957–58

References

External links
 Greens on Screen

English footballers
Association football forwards
Charlton Athletic F.C. players
Plymouth Argyle F.C. players
Lisburn Distillery F.C. players
Lisburn Distillery F.C. managers
People from Rainham, Kent
1921 births
1984 deaths
English Football League players
Watford F.C. wartime guest players
Brentford F.C. wartime guest players
English football managers